Qazi–Markouizos syndrome is a rare hereditary condition characterized by non-progressive, congenital hypotonia, severe intellectual disability, an increased proportion of type 2 muscle fibers, which additionally exhibited increased size, as well as dysharmonic skeletal maturation. To date, the molecular mechanism of Qazi–Markouizos syndrome, which is also known as Puerto Rican infant hypotonia syndrome, remains unknown.

References

External links 

 

Genetic diseases and disorders
Syndromes